IBF Falun is a floorball club based in Falun, Sweden. Both the men's and women's teams play in the Svenska Superligan (SSL). The men's team won their first SSL gold in 2013 and proceeded to win in 2014, 2015, 2017, 2020, 2021 and 2022 as well. During these successful years, IBF Falun men's team also won three straight Champions Cup golds.

Arena 
Home games are played in the IBF Falun Arena which was inaugurated 2005, under the name FaluKuriren Arena, and has a current capacity of 2400 spectators. The arena is situated in Lugnet in Falun, the main venue for the FIS Nordic World Ski Championships 2015.

Roster (Men)
Men's team as of 27 August 2020

Roster (Women)
Women's team as of 21 March 2016 

National team caps as of 22 March 2016

External links
http://www.ibffalun.com IBF Falun's official web site

References

Sports teams in Sweden
Swedish floorball teams
1993 establishments in Sweden
Sports clubs established in 1993
Falun
Sport in Falun
Sport in Dalarna County